The  is a mixed-use building in the Arakawa special ward of Tokyo, Japan. Completed in April 2008, it stands at 153 m (502 ft) tall.

See also 
 List of tallest structures in Tokyo

References

External links
 

Office buildings completed in 2008
Residential buildings completed in 2008
Skyscraper office buildings in Tokyo
Residential skyscrapers in Tokyo
Arakawa, Tokyo
2008 establishments in Japan